Arisa Mochizuki (born 15 April 1994) is a Japanese professional footballer who plays as a goalkeeper for WE League club Omiya Ardija Ventus.

Club career 
Mochizuki made her WE League debut on 12 September 2021.

References 

Living people
1994 births
Women's association football goalkeepers
Japanese women's footballers
Association football people from Tokyo
Omiya Ardija Ventus players
WE League players